Boubacar Talatou (born December 3, 1987 in Niamey) is a Nigerien footballer. He plays as a midfielder for Djoliba AC in Mali.

Career
Diego previously played for AS FNIS, Gabon's AS Mangasport and South African team Orlando Pirates.

International career
He is a member of the Niger national football team, having been called up to the 2012 Africa Cup of Nations and 2013 Africa Cup of Nations.

References

External links

1987 births
Living people
Nigerien footballers
Nigerien expatriate footballers
Niger international footballers
Association football midfielders
People from Niamey
AS Mangasport players
Orlando Pirates F.C. players
Thanda Royal Zulu F.C. players
C.R. Caála players
AS FAN players
Djoliba AC players
South African Premier Division players
National First Division players
Girabola players
2012 Africa Cup of Nations players
2013 Africa Cup of Nations players
Expatriate footballers in Gabon
Expatriate soccer players in South Africa
Expatriate footballers in Angola
Expatriate footballers in Mali